Willem Romeyn (ca.1624, Haarlem – after 1693), was a Dutch Golden Age landscape painter.

Biography
According to the RKD Romeyn was a pupil of Nicolaes Berchem in Haarlem in 1642. His first dated works are from 1645, and his last dated work is from 1694. From 1646 he became a member of the Haarlem Guild of Saint Luke. In 1650-1651 he travelled to Rome. He returned to Haarlem and the guild there, of which he was "vinder" in 1659 along with Frans de Hulst (deacon was Thomas Wijck) and in 1661 he was "oud-vinder", while Frans de Hulst was deacon and Jacob de Wet was vinder. He was nominated with Jacob de Wet again for "vinder" in 1670 (they lost to Jan de Bray and Gerrit Pietersen Berchem).

His landscapes often show grazing animals, particularly cattle and sheep, which have been confused in the past with works by Berchem, Hendrik Mommers, Adriaen van der Kabel, Willem Buytewech, and Dirck Helmbreeker.
Wilhelm von Kobell was his follower.

References

Willem Romeyn on Artnet

1620s births
1693 deaths
Dutch Golden Age painters
Dutch male painters
Artists from Haarlem
Painters from Haarlem